Winchester RFC is an English rugby union club that is affiliated with the Hampshire RFU.  Winchester currently run three senior men's teams - 1st XV, 2nd XV - who play in Hampshire 2 and a 3rd XV (Winchester Knights - largely a veteran's side) who play in Hampshire 3. There is a Women's team and mini and juniors and Colts sides covering all age groups from U5s upwards.  The men's 1st XV currently play in London 2 South West - a tier 7 league in the English rugby union system - having won promotion as champions of London 3 South West at the end of the 2018-19 season.

History
Winchester was founded in autumn 1929 when 17 rugby enthusiasts met at the Cart & Horses pub in Kings Worthy. Up until 1971 their home ground was a field rented from a farmer in Kings Worthy when they moved to their present 10 acre ground at North Walls Park off Hilliers Way.

In 1994 local businessman Ashley Levett whose sons played in the mini and junior sections invested in the club and funded an extension the clubhouse which was originally built in 1973. Levett secured the services of Winchester's first paid coach Phil Davies who orchestrated Winchester being promoted from Hampshire 1 to London Division 1 in four years and winning two Hampshire Cup victories. Levett also purchased Richmond turning them into the first professional team in England but RFU rules prevented him having financial interests in two clubs and he departed Winchester.

League record

Honours

Men's 1st XV
Hampshire Cup winners: 1976, 1998, 1999
Hampshire 1 champions (2): 1990–91, 1995–96
London 2 South West champions: 1996–97
London 2 South champions: 1998–99
London 3 South West champions (2): 2012–13, 2018–19

Youth/Colts
Hampshire Colts Division 1 champions: 2018–19

Notable club members
Ben Donnell, lock/back-row who plays for London Irish and has represented  at U18 and U20 level.
Chris Ashwin, fly-half who played for Winchester, Hampshire and Bristol.
Andy Fields, hooker who played for  Hong Kong and Valley, represented  at U20 and U18 level and was Head Coach of Winchester for seven years.
Rolf Stratford, started playing with Winchester with stints at New Brighton and Rosslyn Park and represented British Polytechnics, English Students and Hampshire, returning to Winchester as a player, coach for many teams and was the club's President.
Budge Pountney, flanker who won 31 caps and captained  and was a player and then Director of Rugby at Northampton Saints.
LeRoy Angel BEM, winger, played over 500 times for Winchester, most capped wing three-quarter for Hampshire, President of the RFU in 2005
Ernest Beddard Jackson, prop who played over 200 times for Winchester and also for Worcester and had four  call ups between 1952-53.
Charles Sylvester Wooldridge, played for Blackheath and  seven times between 1882 and 1885, was the club's first President.

Notes

References

External links

Bedhampton
Sport in Winchester
English rugby union teams
Rugby clubs established in 1929
Rugby union clubs in Hampshire